Chelsey Branham is an American politician, who was elected to the Oklahoma House of Representatives in the 2018 elections. She will represent the 83rd House District as a member of the Democratic Party.

A member of the Chickasaw Nation, she is openly-LGBT.

References

21st-century American politicians
21st-century American women politicians
21st-century Native American politicians
21st-century Native American women
21st-century American LGBT people
LGBT Native Americans
LGBT state legislators in Oklahoma
Living people
Democratic Party members of the Oklahoma House of Representatives
Chickasaw Nation state legislators in Oklahoma
Native American women in politics
Women state legislators in Oklahoma
Year of birth missing (living people)